Chalcostibite is a copper antimony sulfide mineral.

Příbramite is related, having selenium instead of sulfur. Emplectite contains bismuth instead of antimony.

Occurrences 
 Argentina
 Salta Province
 Los Andes department
 San Antonio de los Cobres
 Organullo mining district
  Julio Verne mine
 Australia 
 New South Wales
 Sandon Co.l
 Hillgrove
 Austria
 Carinthia
 Völkermarkt District
 Rammersdorf
 Dragonerfels
  Modre quarry
 Wolfsberg District
 Bad Sankt Leonhard im Lavanttal
 Kliening
 Mischlinggraben
  Staubmann Mines
 Salzburg
 Zell am See District
 Rauris
 Hochtor area
 Silver mines (Knappenstube)
 Styria
 Murtal District
 Pölstal
 Oberzeiring
 Tyrol
 Murtal District
 Pölstal
 Oberzeiring

See also 

 List of minerals

References 

Orthorhombic minerals
Minerals in space group 62
Antimony minerals
Copper minerals